885 Naval Air Squadron (885 NAS) was a Naval Air Squadron of the Royal Navy's Fleet Air Arm. First formed on 1 March 1941, the squadron served as a fighter squadron during the Second World War. It operated in the Mediterranean in 1942–43, where it took part in Operation Torch, the Anglo-American invasion of French North Africa, the Allied invasion of Sicily and the Allied invasion of Italy. In 1944 it took part in the Allied invasion of Normandy, spotting for Allied artillery bombardments and in 1945, was deployed as part of the British Pacific Fleet. It was abolished for the last time on 27 September 1945.

Service
885 Naval Air Squadron was first formed on 1 March 1941 at HMS Grebe in Egypt, also known as RNAS Dhekeila, the pre-war Alexandria airport, as a carrier fighter squadron, equipped with a mix of Brewster Buffalo and Gloster Gladiator fighters. The squadron briefly served aboard the carrier  later that month, but was disbanded on 1 May 1941.

The squadron was reformed at RNAS Yeovilton, equipped with Hawker Sea Hurricane fighters on 1 December 1941. In June 1942, 885 NAS embarked on the carrier , strengthening the carrier's air wing before Victorious formed part of the distant escort for the disastrous arctic convoy PQ 17 and the return convoy QP 13. The squadron re-embarked its six Sea Hurricanes aboard Victorious on 31 July 1942 before the carrier set out to take part in the Malta Convoy Operation Pedestal. The Squadron remained on Formidable as the carrier covered the Allied invasion of Sicily in July 1943 and Operation Avalanche, the Allied landings near Salerno, Italy  in September 1943. The squadron returned to Britain in October 1943 and was disbanded on 15 November 1943.

The squadron reformed again at RNAS Lee-on-Solent on 15 February 1944, again equipped with Seafires. Following the Allied invasion of Normandy on 6 June 1944, the squadron was employed as part of RAF Second Tactical Air Force's air spotting pool, spotting for Allied artillery bombardments as well as escorting shipping in the Channel and carrying out fighter sweeps. In July, 886 and 897 Naval Air Squadrons, both also Seafire-equipped, were merged with 885 Squadron. In November 1944, the squadron re-equipped with Grumman Hellcat fighters in preparation for a transfer to the British Pacific Fleet. The squadron embarked on the escort carrier  in December 1944, with Ruler meeting up with the British Pacific fleet in April 1945. Ruler was tasked with providing fighter and anti submarine protection for the Fleet Train replenishment ships supporting the fleet, with 885 Squadron supplementing its eighteen Hellcats with four Grumman Avenger bombers for anti-submarine duties. On 14–15 May, the squadron provided air cover while the British Pacific Fleet replenished during the Battle of Okinawa, with the squadron's aircraft also being used as targets to train the fleet's fighter controllers and anti-aircraft gunners. After the end of Okinawa operations, the squadron disembarked at Ponam Island off New Guinea, providing continuation flying for replacement pilots for the fleet, and temporarily adding some Vought Corsairs while ashore to improve the training it could offer. From June, 885 Squadron operated from Ruler to cover more refuelling operations during operations against Japan. The squadron was disbanded at RAAF Station Schofields, near Sydney Australia on 27 September 1945.

References

  
 
 
 
 
 
 
 

800 series Fleet Air Arm squadrons
Military units and formations established in 1941
Military units and formations of the Royal Navy in World War II